Tu'pest is a greatest hits compilation of the Bulgarian rock band Hipodil, released in 2000 under the Riva Sound label, the band's fifth and last release with that company. The name is a pun - from tup - Bulgarian for "dumb", and -est, the superlative suffix in English as in "the best".

The main purpose of the release was to finally offer most of the early hits by the band on a CD as Hipodil's first three albums were released on audio cassettes only. Despite the CD release however most of the tracks were hardly remastered and still sound pretty similar to the original versions.

It was also Hipodil's first appearance on CD.
  
As there are no singles in the classic meaning of the term and no verifiable sales or airplay charts in Bulgaria and Bulgarian record companies do not report sales figures it is also impossible to assess the commercial success of the songs in this compilation. Most of the songs however were Hipodil live favourites and undoubtedly enjoyed immense popularity among the public.

The Music 
Tu'pest contains 23 tracks from the four previous Hipodil albums with band's 1993 debut Alkoholen delirium being represented by six songs (see Tracks below). Hipodil's second album Nekuf ujas, nekuf at of 1993 and S gol v rukata... from 1996 - produced five tracks each and, remarkably, the band's most successful album, the 1998 Nadurveni vuglishta - also five songs.

Tracks 

 B.G./Bate Gojko (Big Brother Gojko) - from Nadurveni vuglishta
 Jenata (The Woman) - from Alkoholen delirium
 S gol v rukata... (With Naked... In Hand) - from S gol v rukata...
 More ot Alkohol (Sea of Alcohol) - from Nekuf ujas, nekuf at
 Nishto (Nothing) - from Nadurveni vuglishta
 Balada za bratiata Holik (The Ballad of the Holic Brothers) - from S gol v rukata...
 Chift Ochi (Pair of Eyes) - from Alkoholen delirium
 Bira (Beer)- from Alkoholen delirium
 Psiho (Psycho) - from Nekuf ujas, nekuf at
 Vuzbuden sum (I'm Horny) - from Nadurveni vuglishta
 Kato Slunce (Like the Sun) - from S gol v rukata...
 Mrusen, gaden den(Nasty, Dirty Day) - from Nekuf ujas, nekuf at
 Himna (The Anthem) - from Alkoholen delirium
 Vuzbuden sum! (I'm Horny) - from Nadurveni vuglishta
 Ovtzi (Sheep) - from S gol v rukata...
 Bless me - from Nadurveni vuglishta
 Alkoholen delirium/Bira s vodka (Alcoholic Delirium/Beer & Vodka) - from Alkoholen delirium
 Oblatzi (Clouds) - from Nekuf ujas, nekuf at
 Galileo - from Nekuf ujas, nekuf at
 D'ska (a pun between ska and the Bulgarian "duska", which means "plank") - from Nadurveni vuglishta
 Momicheto (The Girl)- from Alkoholen delirium
 Vujen (Rope-made) - from S gol v rukata...
 Hipodili (Hipodils) - from Nekuf ujas, nekuf at

External links
 Tu'pest at Discogs

Hipodil albums
1999 greatest hits albums